Delisle is a small lunar impact crater in the western part of the Mare Imbrium. It was named after French astronomer Joseph-Nicolas Delisle. It lies to the north of the crater Diophantus, and just to the northwest of the ridge designated Mons Delisle. Between Delisle and Diophantus is a sinuous rille named Rima Diophantus, with a diameter of 150 km. To the northeast is another rille designated Rima Delisle, named after this crater.

The rim of Delisle is somewhat polygonal in form and it has a low central rise on the floor. There is some slight slumping along the inner wall, but overall the rim is still relatively fresh with little appearance of significant wear. The outer rim is surrounded by a small rampart of hummocky terrain.

This formation has also been designated "De l'Isle" in some sources.

Rima Delisle
This is a sinuous rille centered on selenographic coordinates 31.0° N, 32.0° W. It occupies a maximum diameter of 60 km. Three tiny craters in the vicinity of this feature have been assigned names by the IAU. These are listed in the table below.

Satellite craters
By convention these features are identified on lunar maps by placing the letter on the side of the crater midpoint that is closest to Delisle.

References

External links

 LTO39B2 Delisle — L&PI topographic map

Impact craters on the Moon
Mare Imbrium